Byron Miranda is an American television journalist. The five-time Regional Emmy Award-winner, currently morning meteorologist on WPIX in New York City.

Personal background
A California native, Miranda served in the United States Air Force and worked as an air traffic controller in Korea. After the Air Force, Miranda attended California State University, East Bay, where he received his Bachelor of Arts degree in Communications. To support his family, Miranda joined the Oakland Police Department. Miranda is the father of one daughter, Briana, a merchandise display expert, who lives in San Francisco.

Broadcasting career
Miranda began his television career as an assignment editor and has worked in a number of major media markets, including Atlanta, Chicago, Houston, Los Angeles,  San Diego, and San Francisco. Miranda joined WPIX in New York City on June 19, 2017.

 Atlanta: CNN, CNN International and NBC Early Today meteorologist
 Chicago: WMAQ (NBC) meteorologist (1998-2002, 2014–2017) 
 Los Angeles: KCBS (CBS) chief meteorologist (2002–2005)
 Houston: KPRC (NBC) meteorologist (2006)
 San Francisco: KTVU (Fox) meteorologist (2006)
 San Diego: KGTV (ABC) chief meteorologist (2009–2011)
 Los Angeles: KNBC (NBC) meteorologist (2011-2014)

Guest appearances
 1999: ER, "The Storm: Part 1" Weatherman #1 (voice)

Honors and awards
 2000: Regional Emmy Award (Chicago/Midwest Chapter) Outstanding Achievement for Special Events Programs – Not Created for Television (Award to Producer), National Academy of Television Arts & Sciences; NBC 5 presents The 92nd Chicago Auto Show
Producers: Matt Piacente, executive producer; Lici Kestner-Lytle; Carol Cooling; Kevin Krebs; Tom Schnecke
Hosts: Brant Miller, Mike Adamle, Dawn DeSart, Byron Miranda, Amy Stone, Shelly Monahan
 2002: Regional Emmy Award (Chicago/Midwest Chapter) Outstanding Achievement for Special Events Programs – Special Event Program Not Created for Television (Award to Producer), National Academy of Television Arts & Sciences; NBC5 presents: The 2002 Chicago Auto Show
Matt Piacente, Executive Producer; Lici Kestner-Lytle, Senior Producer; Lara Mondragon, Segment Producer; Carol Cooling, Tom Schnecke, Producers; Brant Miller, Jeanne Sparrow, Tammie Souza, Bill Keller, Ed Curran, Byron Miranda, Field Producers
 2003: Golden Mike Award, Best Weathercaster in Southern California
 2011: Regional Emmy Award (Pacific Southwest Chapter) On-Camera Talent – Weather, National Academy of Television Arts and Sciences

References

Further reading
 Dawkins, Wayne. Rugged waters: black journalists swim the mainstream, August Press LLC, page 55, 2003. 

Living people
Journalists from California
American television news anchors
Regional Emmy Award winners
American television reporters and correspondents
California State University, East Bay alumni
Mississippi State University alumni
Air traffic controllers
Year of birth missing (living people)